Zakharovo is a rural locality (a selo) in Bezrukavsky Selsoviet, Rubtsovsky District, Altai Krai, Russia. The population was 230 as of 2013. There are 4 streets.

Geography 
Zakharovo is located 21 km north of Rubtsovsk (the district's administrative centre) by road. Zarnitsa is the nearest rural locality.

References 

Rural localities in Rubtsovsky District